Roger Griswold (May 21, 1762 – October 25, 1812) was a nineteenth-century lawyer, politician and judge from Connecticut. He served as a member of the United States House of Representatives, judge of the Connecticut Supreme Court and the 22nd Governor of Connecticut, serving as a Federalist.

Biography

Griswold was born in Lyme in the Connecticut Colony to Matthew Griswold and Ursula (Wolcott) Griswold of the prominent Griswold family. He pursued classical studies, entered Yale College at the age of fourteen and graduated from Yale in 1780. He received a Doctor of Law degree from Harvard University in 1811, and a Doctor of Law degree from Yale in 1812.

Griswold studied law with his father and was admitted to the bar in 1783. He began the practice of law in Norwich, Connecticut. He returned to Lyme in 1794 and was elected as a Federalist candidate to the Fourth United States Congress and to the five succeeding Congresses. Griswold served in Congress from March 4, 1795 until his resignation in 1805 prior to the convening of the Ninth Congress. During the Sixth Congress, he served as chairman of the Committee on Revisal and Unfinished Business and as a member of the Committee on Ways and Means.

In 1803 Griswold, along with several other New England Federalist politicians, proposed secession from the union due to the growing
influence of Jeffersonian Democrats and the Louisiana Purchase, which they felt would dilute Northern influence. Griswold declined President John Adams' request for him to serve as the Secretary of War in 1801.

Griswold served as judge of the Supreme Court of Connecticut from 1807 to 1809. He was presidential elector on the Charles Cotesworth Pinckney and Rufus King ticket. He was the Lieutenant Governor of Connecticut from 1809 to 1811, and was the Governor of Connecticut from 1811 until his unexpected death in Norwich on October 25, 1812, at the age of 50. He is interred in Griswold Cemetery at Black Hall, in the town of Lyme (now Old Lyme, Connecticut). When Griswold, Connecticut was incorporated in 1815, it was named in his honor.

Lyon-Griswold brawl
On January 30, 1798, a hearing was held on whether or not to remove William Blount of Tennessee from office. Matthew Lyon, a Democratic-Republican congressman from Vermont, was ignoring Griswold on purpose, because they were from opposite parties. This led to Griswold calling Lyon a scoundrel to which Lyon retaliated by spitting in Griswold's face. Two weeks later, after Lyon was not removed from office for the spitting, Griswold attacked Lyon with his cane.

Personal life
Griswold's father Matthew Griswold was the 17th Governor of Connecticut from 1784 to 1786. 
Griswold's maternal grandfather Roger Wolcott was the colonial governor of Connecticut from 1751 to 1754.

Griswold married Fanny Rogers on October 27, 1798 and they had ten children together.

References

Further reading

External links
 
 Biographocal Directory of the United States Congress: GRISWOLD, Roger, (1762 - 1812)
 National Governors Association: Connecticut Governor Roger Griswold
 Governors of Connecticut: Roger Griswold
 Official Website of the State of Connecticut
 The Political Graveyard: Griswold, Roger (1762-1812)
 Govtrack.us: Rep. Roger Griswold
 

1762 births
1812 deaths
People from Lyme, Connecticut
People of colonial Connecticut
Griswold family
American people of English descent
Federalist Party members of the United States House of Representatives from Connecticut
Federalist Party state governors of the United States
Governors of Connecticut
Lieutenant Governors of Connecticut
Justices of the Connecticut Supreme Court
Yale College alumni